Sommerfeltia is a genus of South American plants in the tribe Astereae within the family Asteraceae.

 Species
 Sommerfeltia cabrerae Chebat. - Uruguay (Tacuarembó, Rivera)
 Sommerfeltia spinulosa  (Spreng.) Less. - Brazil (Rio Grande do Sul, Santa Catarina), Uruguay (Canelones, Colonia, Maldonado, Montevideo, Rocha), and Argentina (Buenos Aires)

References

Asteraceae genera
Flora of South America
Astereae